Truthout is a non-profit news organization which describes itself as "dedicated to providing independent reporting and commentary on a diverse range of social justice issues". Truthout's main areas of focus include mass incarceration, prison abolition, social justice, climate change, militarism, economy and labor, LGBTQ rights and reproductive justice.

Truthout's Executive Director is Ziggy West Jeffery and the Editor-in-Chief is Britney Schultz.

Notable reporting and projects

Controversial reporting on Karl Rove 
On May 13, 2006, after Jason Leopold posted on Truthout that Karl Rove had been indicted by the grand jury investigating the Plame affair, Rove spokesman Mark Corallo denied the story, calling it "a complete fabrication". Truthout defended the story, saying on May 15 they had two sources "who were explicit about the information" published, and confirmed on May 25 that they had "three independent sources confirming that attorneys for Karl Rove were handed an indictment" on the night of May 12. The grand jury concluded without returning an indictment of Rove.

In his memoir, Courage and Consequence, Rove addressed the Leopold article, writing that Leopold is a "nut with Internet access" and that "thirty-five reporters called [Rove's defense attorney] Luskin or Corallo to ask about the Truthout report." According to Rove, "[Special Counsel] Fitzgerald got a kick out of the fictitious account and e-mailed Luskin to see how he felt after such a long day."

Jason Leopold continued to write investigative pieces for Truthout through 2014; he joined Vice News that year.

Safety issues at BP
60 Minutes cited a report published at Truthout as a source for its May 16, 2010 episode about the BP oil spill and the whistleblower who warned about a possible blowout at another BP deepwater drilling site.
Digital Journal wrote up the story. CNN's Randi Kaye in an article cited a report by Truthout as the first article on BP Alaska employee Mark Kovac's inside knowledge about the safety concerns at the Prudhoe Bay, Alaska BP oil field.
On July 14, 2010, the United States House of Representatives Committee on Transportation and Infrastructure held a hearing in the Subcommittee on Railroads, Pipelines and Hazardous Materials. The hearing titled "The Safety of Hazardous Liquid Pipelines (Part 2): Integrity Management", cited an investigative report by Truthout as a document for the committee's investigation.

Offshore fracking 
In 2013, Truthout journalist Mike Ludwig unearthed with a Freedom of Information Act request with the Interior Department revealed that fracking technology was being used on offshore oil rigs in the ecologically sensitive Santa Barbara Channel. Coastal conservationists were alarmed, and environmental groups sprang into action, generating protests and broad public discussion about offshore fracking. At one point, lawsuits filed by environmental groups forced federal officials to place a moratorium on offshore fracking in the Channel while regulators reviewed the practice and their rules for making it safe. In 2014, the EPA issued a new rules requiring offshore drillers to disclose fracking chemicals they dump into the ocean off the California coast.

Illegal Navy training 
In 2016, Dahr Jamail and Truthout released Navy documents outlining plans for combat training exercises along vast non-military areas of Washington state coastline. The documents showed the areas the Navy was prepared to utilize, without the mandatory risk assessments, medical plans, surveys of training areas and coordinating their activities with local, state and federal law enforcement officials. The release of these documents forced the Navy to postpone this training for at least 2 years. It caused commotion within the Washington state government, as they were not aware of the Navy's plans.

Awards

Donald F. Erickson Synapses Award 
In 2022, the Crossroads Fund presented The Donald F. Erickson Synapses Award to Truthout, for independent reporting and commentary on a diverse range of social justice issues.

2021 Izzy Award 
The thirteenth annual Izzy Award was awarded to nonprofit news outlet Truthout, journalist Liliana Segura, senior reporter at The Intercept and journalist Tim Schwab, writing in The Nation.

2018 Izzy Award 
Dahr Jamail was awarded the 2018 Izzy Award for outstanding achievement in independent media for his reporting on climate change and other environmental issues. The judges wrote: "There is an urgency and passion in Dahr Jamail's reporting that is justified by the literally earth-changing subject matter. And it's supported by science and on-the-scene sources, whether covering ocean pollution, sea level rise, deafening noise pollution or Fukushima radiation."

Jamail produces a monthly wrap-up of the latest climate research and trends – "Climate Disruption Dispatches".

San Francisco Press Club Journalism Awards 
A joint Truthout and Earth Island Journal investigation "America's Toxic Prisons" by Candice Bernd, Zoe Loftus-Farren, and Maureen Nandini Mitra won awards in two categories of the 2018 San Francisco Press Club Journalism Awards. The investigation won second place in the Magazines category for environment/nature reporting and investigative reporting.

Martha Gellhorn Prize for Journalism 
In 2012, Truthout journalist Gareth Porter was awarded the Martha Gellhorn Prize for Journalism for his work uncovering the Obama administration's military strategy in Afghanistan. "In a series of extraordinary articles, Gareth Porter has torn away the facades of the Obama administration and disclosed a military strategy that amounts to a war against civilians." Amongst Porter's award-winning stories were 'How McChrystal and Petraeus Built an Indiscriminate "Killing Machine,"' and 'The Lies That Sold Obama's Escalation in Afghanistan.'

Society of Professional Journalists' Sigma Delta Chi Awards 
Maya Schenwar, currently the editor in chief of Truthout, was awarded in the 2013 Online Column Writing category by the Society of Professional Journalists Sigma Delta Chi Awards for her columns on mass incarceration, the death penalty, and solitary confinement.

History

In 2011, Truthout suffered a hacking breach in which ten days of articles were deleted.

Freelancer and Truthout writer Aaron Miguel Cantú was one of six journalists faced with felony rioting charges after covering the inauguration of Donald Trump.  In July 2018, all charges against Cantu and many of the other protestors were dismissed.

Staff
Truthout's Executive Director is Ziggy West Jeffery and the Editor-in-Chief is Britney Schultz.

Truthout's Board of Directors is made up of Maya Schenwar, McMaster University Professor and educational theorist Henry A. Giroux, policy director Robert Naiman, and Lewis R. Gordon.

Truthout's Board of Advisors includes Mark Ruffalo, Dean Baker, Richard D. Wolff, William Ayers, Mark Weisbrot. Howard Zinn was formerly a member of the advisory board.

See also
Truth (anti-tobacco campaign)

References

External links
 

American political websites
American news websites
501(c)(3) organizations
Alternative journalism organizations
Creative Commons-licensed websites
Organizations established in 2000
2000 establishments in California